Dactylagnus peratikos is a species of sand stargazer found along the Atlantic coast of Costa Rica and Panama.  It can reach a maximum length of  SL.

References

peratikos
Taxa named by James Erwin Böhlke
Fish described in 1961